The Gijou is a  long river in the Tarn department in southern France. Its source is at Lacaune. It flows generally west-southwest. It is a right tributary of the Agout, into which it flows at Vabre.

Communes along its course
This list is ordered from source to mouth: Lacaune, Gijounet, Viane, Lacaze, Saint-Pierre-de-Trivisy, Vabre

References

Rivers of France
Rivers of Occitania (administrative region)
Rivers of Tarn (department)